SMS Iltis was the lead ship of the  of gunboats built for the German Kaiserliche Marine (Imperial Navy) in the late 1890s and early 1900s.

Design

She displaced  at full load. Her propulsion system consisted of a pair of horizontal triple-expansion steam engines each driving a single screw propeller, with steam supplied by four coal-fired Thornycroft boilers. She had a crew of 9 officers and 121 enlisted men. Iltis was armed with a main battery of four  SK L/30 guns, with 1,124 rounds of ammunition. She also carried six machine guns.

Service history

Iltis was laid down at the Schichau-Werke shipyard in Danzig in 1897. She was launched on 4 August 1898 and commissioned into the German fleet on 1 December that year. After entering service, Iltis was sent abroad, to Germany's main naval force in Asia, the East Asia Squadron. Shortly thereafter, the Boxer Rebellion broke out in China. Kaiser Wilhelm II decided that an expeditionary force was necessary to reinforce the Eight Nation Alliance that had formed to defeat the Boxers. The expeditionary force consisted of the four s, six cruisers, 10 freighters, three torpedo boats, and six regiments of marines, under the command of Marshal Alfred von Waldersee.

After the outbreak of World War I in early August 1914, the light cruiser  captured the Russian steamer Ryazan and brought her back to Tsingtao. Men from the crews of Iltis, the unprotected cruiser  and the gunboat  were used to man Ryazan, which was commissioned as the auxiliary cruiser . Iltis was then scuttled on 28 September 1914 during the Siege of Tsingtao. Three of her sisters were also scuttled during the siege.

Notes

References

Further reading

1898 ships
Ships built in Danzig
Iltis-class gunboats
World War I naval ships of Germany
Maritime incidents in September 1914
Scuttled vessels of Germany
World War I shipwrecks in the Pacific Ocean
Shipwrecks of China